Maxi Glamour is a non-binary multi-disciplinary drag artist from St. Louis, Missouri, and the self-titled "Demon Queen of Polka and Baklava". They were a contestant in Season 3 of The Boulet Brothers' Dragula.

Career

Qu'art 
Glamour founded the St. Louis-based Qu'art in 2014 and organizes shows that promote diversity in the queer arts scene, citing PLUR (Peace Love Unity Respect) from the raver scene as an influence. Glamour is outspoken about the lack of Black performers at Queer events in the St. Louis area, and has said, "If you're a producer and you're not putting Black people in your show, maybe you shouldn't be producing." Glamour also advocates for transgender, AFAB, and non-Black people of color performers. To promote civic and political education, each Qu'art event includes a panel featuring community leaders, activists, and artists speaking about issues that affect Queer lives.

Glamour has also demonstrated in full drag, including in front of former mayor Lyda Krewson's home. Glamour created a petition calling for Krewson's resignation and later organized a debate focused on local LGBTQ+ issues for the 2021 St. Louis mayoral election.

Dragula 
Glamour may be the first drag performer from St. Louis to appear on a major televised drag competition. Their international debut was in The Boulet Brothers' Dragula Season 3 in 2019. They participated in the first episode elimination challenge, which involved skydiving in drag, and were eliminated in the fourth episode.

Music 
Glamour plays flute and other instruments. They signed with independent label Trans Trenderz for an experimental debut album, Modernadada, released in 2021. Q Review describes the album as a "battle-cry" and allegory for self-actualization.

Influences 
Glamour claims influences from the Dada movement and artist Marcel Duchamp. They call their own art form "Modernadada".

References

External links
 Official website
 OnStL Interview
Armour Magazine interview

African-American drag queens
American drag queens
LGBT people from Missouri
People from St. Louis
Year of birth missing (living people)
Living people
Non-binary drag performers
The Boulet Brothers' Dragula contestants